Emily Dawn Calandrelli is an American science communicator, former MIT engineer, and the host and an executive producer of Xploration Outer Space and Emily's Wonder Lab.

Early life and education
Emily Calandrelli grew up in Morgantown, West Virginia and attended West Virginia University. As a student, she won numerous academic awards. She became a Truman Scholar which led to her working for one summer in Washington, D.C. for her US Representative Alan Mollohan. In 2009, she was named to the USA Today all-academic team, won the Barry M. Goldwater Scholarship, and was voted Ms. Mountaineer. She later graduated with a B.S. degree in Mechanical Engineering and Aerospace Engineering in 2010. 

Subsequently, Calandrelli attended the Massachusetts Institute of Technology (MIT) where she obtained an M.S. degree in Aeronautics and Astronautics as well an M.S. degree in Technology and Policy in 2013.  In 2011, Calandrelli was awarded the René Miller Prize in Systems Engineering. As a Harvard NASA Tournament Lab visiting scholar, she assisted organizations in using crowdsourcing to solve technical challenges.

Career
As a college student, Calandrelli worked at NASA as an intern. Her work at NASA included designing the simulation for the Phoenix Mars Lander's soil testing experiment, research on the use of lasers to reduce harmful emissions from jet engines, and developing chemical detection sensors.  

Calandrelli is a professional speaker and presents on the topics of space exploration, scientific literacy, and gender equality in STEM (science, technology, engineering, and mathematics). She is a TEDx speaker and a contributing writer at TechCrunch. Additionally, Calandrelli is a Brooke Owens Fellowship Mentor.  

Calandrelli started a career in science communication when she became a host of Xploration Outer Space in Fox's Xploration Station educational block in 2014. In April 2017, she made several appearances on Netflix episodes of Bill Nye Saves the World. On August 25, 2020 Calandrelli's educational Netflix series titled Emily's Wonder Lab debuted. Calandrelli filmed the series while 9 months pregnant. 

She has written the Ada Lace series of chapter books to introduce youth to science and technology and the picture book Reach for the Stars (2022), illustrated by Honee Jang.

She is a paid influencer for the propane industry, according to Propane Education and Research Council (PERC) documents.

Awards
In April 2017, Calandrelli was nominated for an Outstanding Host in a Lifestyle/Children's/Travel or Family Viewing Program daytime Emmy Award for her work on Xploration Station.

Personal life
In January 2011, Calandrelli became a licensed amateur radio operator under the callsign KD8PKR.

References

External links

 Emily Calandrelli at TED

1987 births
Amateur radio people
American television hosts
American women television presenters
Living people
MIT School of Engineering alumni
People from Morgantown, West Virginia
Science communicators
Scientists from West Virginia
West Virginia University alumni